Windmill Down is a rural location near the town of Hambledon in Hampshire. From 1782 to 1795, it was the home of the Hambledon Club as a noted cricket venue.

Hambledon used Broadhalfpenny Down from at least 1753 until 1781 when it was abandoned for being "too remote". Broadhalfpenny is about two miles from the village whereas Windmill Down is adjacent, although Broadhalfpenny had a pub immediately opposite (the famous Bat and Ball Inn) but Windmill Down did not.

On Tuesday 18 June 1782, the Hampshire Chronicle reported the first meeting on Windmill Down, referring to the ground as "a field called the New Broad Halfpenny adjoining to the Town of Hambledon". It is probable but unconfirmed that the first match was played there a week later. The first definite first-class cricket match was Hampshire v All-England in August 1782, All-England winning by 147 runs.

Windmill Down was used regularly as the home venue for Hampshire matches until July 1795 when the last recorded match took place there.

References

Further reading
 G B Buckley, Fresh Light on 18th Century Cricket, Cotterell, 1935
 Arthur Haygarth, Scores & Biographies, Volume 1 (1744-1826), Lillywhite, 1862
 Ashley Mote, The Glory Days of Cricket, Robson, 1997
 Ashley Mote, John Nyren's "The Cricketers of my Time", Robson, 1998
 H T Waghorn, The Dawn of Cricket, Electric Press, 1906

1782 establishments in England
Cricket grounds in Hampshire
Cricket in Hampshire
Defunct cricket grounds in England
Defunct sports venues in Hampshire
English cricket venues in the 18th century
Hampshire
Hills of Hampshire
History of Hampshire
Sport in Hampshire
Sports venues completed in 1782
Sports venues in Hampshire